Alaa Atiya (born 3 June 1990 in Gaza, Palestine) is a Palestinian professional football (soccer) player currently playing for Jordan Premier League side Al-Yarmouk FC on loan from Ittihad Shajaeya.

Club career
He attracted the attention of many scouts when he scored 24 goals for Gaza Sport in the 2010–2011 season with Egyptian side Al-Ahly and Jordanian juggernauts Al-Wahdat most interested in securing his services. After the 2010–11 season he moved to Ittihad Shajaeya but with league play suspended, secured a loan move to Al-Yarmouk. He scored in his debut in a 3–1 loss to Al-Ramtha and would score the winner from the penalty spot against Manshia Bani Hassan. He also scored in the Jordan FA Cup quarterfinal second leg against Manshia Bani Hassan.

International career
In order to play with his country's national team in the 2012 AFC Challenge Cup, Alaa' Attieh agreed to forego $5,000 in wages. Attieh made his debut for Palestine against the United Arab Emirates on 24 February 2012 but was forced off in the first half with an injury. He scored Palestine's first goal at the 2012 AFC Challenge Cup in the third minute against host Nepal and also assisted on Fahed Attal's second goal.

International goals
Scores and results list the Palestine's goal tally first.

References

External links

1990 births
Living people
People from Gaza City
Palestinian footballers
Palestine international footballers
Association football forwards
Gaza Strip Premier League players